The chotoy spinetail (Schoeniophylax phryganophilus) is a species of bird in the ovenbird family Furnariidae. It is the only species placed in the genus Schoeniophylax. It is found in Uruguay, Paraguay, Bolivia, regions of northern Argentina, and extreme southern Brazil, including the Pantanal. Its natural habitats are subtropical or tropical moist shrubland and heavily degraded former forest.

Within the ovenbird family, the chotoy spinetail is genetically most closely related to the white-bellied spinetail (Mazaria propinqua).

Two subspecies are recognised.
 S. p. phryganophilus (Vieillot, 1817) – Bolivia, south Brazil, Paraguay, Uruguay and north Argentina
 S. p. petersi Pinto, 1949 – east Brazil

References

External links

Chotoy spinetail videos on the Internet Bird Collection
Chotoy spinetail photo gallery VIREO
Photo-Medium Res; Article chandra.as.utexas.edu–"Birds of Brazil"
Photo-High Res; Article tropicalbirding

Furnariidae
Birds of Uruguay
Birds of Paraguay
Birds of the Pantanal
Birds of Bolivia
Birds of Argentina
Birds of Brazil
Birds described in 1817
Taxa named by Louis Jean Pierre Vieillot
Taxonomy articles created by Polbot